Triplophysa alticeps is a species of ray-finned fish in the genus Triplophysa. These stone loaches are occasionally placed in the genus Qinghaichthys by some authorities. It is endemic to Qinghaihu Lake in Qinghai Province, China.

Footnotes 

alticeps
Taxa named by Solomon Herzenstein
Fish described in 1888